Mami may refer to:

People
Cheb Mami, Algerian raï singer
Mami (given name), a Japanese feminine given name
Mami (goddess), a goddess in the Babylonian epic Atra-Hasis
Mami Wata, a pantheon of ancient water spirits or deities

Entertainment
 Mámi (1937 film), Hungarian film with Sári Fedák and Piroska Vaszary 
 "Mami" (song), a 2018 song by Alexandra Stan
 "Mami", a song by A.B. Quintanilla y Los Kumbia All Starz from the album Ayer Fue Kumbia Kings, Hoy Es Kumbia All Starz, 2006
 Mami (rock opera), a 1986 Israeli rock opera

Acronyms
MAMI Moscow State Technical University
MAMI, an abbreviation for Mainz Microtron, an electron accelerator in Germany
Mumbai Academy of the Moving Image (MAMI), a public trust that organizes the annual international film festival

Other
Mami, Kerman, a village in Iran
Mami (hip hop), a term in hip hop for an attractive Latina woman
Mami soup, a type of egg noodle soup found in the Philippines

See also
Maami, a 2011 film directed by Tunde Kelani
Mämmi, a traditional Finnish Easter dessert
Mamiii, a 2022 song by Becky G and Karol G
Mamie (disambiguation)
Mammy (disambiguation)